Argyresthia minusculella is a moth of the  family Yponomeutidae. It is found in the Azores.

References

Moths described in 1940
Argyresthia
Moths of Europe